Sunshine Barry & The Disco Worms (also known as simply Disco Worms) is a 2008 Danish-German 3D computer-animated film directed by Thomas Borch Nielsen from a screenplay by Nielsen and Morten Dragsted.

Premise 
Earthworm Barry gets no respect and lives at the bottom of the food chain, but one day he finds an old disco record which arouses his interest in music, and, with help from friend Gloria, they decide to create the greatest disco band the world has ever seen: Sunshine Barry & The Disco Worms.

Voice cast 
 Peter Frödin as Bjarne (Barry)
 Lars Hjortshøj as Niller
 Trine Dyrholm as Gloria
 Troels Lyby as Jimmy
  as Donna
 Birthe Neumann as Mor
  as Far
 Henning Jensen as Tonni Dennis
  as Justesen
  as Naturspeaker
 Kim Hagen Jensen as Promotor
 Tonni Zinck as Skolopender
 Casper Byriel Svane as Flue
 Kirsten Skytte and Margit Rosenaa as Døgnflue
 Fedor Bondarchuk as Tonni Dennis
 Denis Hückel as Käfer
 Olavi Uusivirta as Aaro

Production 
In total, production lasted 16 months on a budget of $5 million. According to Nielsen, the character designs and script took a year to complete. The film also faced difficulty with finding financing, which inevitably took 8 months to find.

Release 
The film was released in Danish theatres on 10 October 2008, and opened with $225,324 for a total of $1,936,776. In Germany, the film was released on 29 October 2009, and grossed $33,604. The worldwide gross for Sunshine Barry & The Disco Worms was $6,371,879.

Critically, the film received generally average to negative reviews.

References

External links 
 (in Danish) 

Sunshine Barry & The Disco Worms at filmportal.de (in German)

2008 films
2008 animated films
2008 computer-animated films
2000s Danish-language films
2000s German-language films
Danish animated films
German animated films
2008 multilingual films
Danish multilingual films
German multilingual films
2000s German films